The recorded military history of China extends from about 2200 BC to the present day. This history can be divided into the military history of China before 1911, when a revolution overthrew the imperial state, and the period of the Republic of China Army and the People's Liberation Army.

Pre-modern period

Although the traditional Chinese Confucian philosophy favored peaceful political solutions and showed contempt for brute military force, the military was influential in most Chinese states. The Chinese pioneered the use of crossbows, advanced metallurgical standardization for arms and armor, early gunpowder weapons, and other advanced weapons, but also adopted nomadic cavalry and Western military technology.  In addition, China's armies also benefited from an advanced logistics system as well as a rich strategic tradition, beginning with Sun Tzu's The Art of War, that deeply influenced military thought.

Modern period

People's Liberation Army

Chinese military history underwent a dramatic transformation in the 20th century, with the People's Liberation Army beginning in 1927 with the start of the Chinese Civil War, and developing from a peasant guerrilla force into what remains the largest armed force in the world.

Republic of China Army

The Republic of China Army was founded as the National Revolutionary Army, the armed wing of Sun Yat-sen's Kuomintang (KMT) in 1924. It participated in the Northern Expedition, the Second Sino-Japanese War (during World War II) and the Chinese Civil War before withdrawing with the ROC government to Taiwan in 1949. After 1949, the ROC Army has participated in combat operations on Kinmen and the Dachen Archipelago against the PLA in the Battle of Kuningtou, and in the First and Second Taiwan Strait Crisis. In addition to these major conflicts, ROCA commandos were regularly sent to raid the Fujian and Guangdong coasts. Until the 1970s, the stated mission of the Army was to retake the mainland from the People's Republic of China. Following the lifting of martial law in 1988 and democratization of the 1990s, the mission of the ROC Army has been shifted to the defense of Taiwan (Formosa), Penghu (the Pescadores Islands), Kinmen and Matsu from a PLA invasion.

With the reduction of the size of the ROC armed forces in recent years, the Army has endured the largest number of cutbacks as ROC military doctrine has begun to emphasize the importance of offshore engagement with the Navy and Air Force.  After this shift in emphasis, the ROC Navy and Air Force have taken precedence over the ROC Army in defense doctrine and weapons procurement.  Recent short-term goals in the Army include acquisition and development of joint command and control systems, advanced attack helicopters and armored vehicles, multiple launch rocket systems and field air defense systems.  The Army is also in the process of transitioning to an all volunteer force.

See also
 List of Chinese wars and battles

References

Further reading
For earlier periods, see Military history of China before 1911 (Further reading)

General
 Elleman, Bruce A. Modern Chinese Warfare, 1795–1989. New York: Routledge, 2001.
 Graff, David Andrew, and Robin Higham, eds. A military history of China (University Press of Kentucky, 2012).
 
 Li, Xiaobing, ed. China at War: An Encyclopedia. Santa Barbara: ABC-CLIO, 2012. online
 Liu, Frederick Fu. A Military History of Modern China, 1924-1949 (1972).
 Lorge, Peter. “Discovering War in Chinese History.” Extrême-Orient Extrême-Occident 1 38 (2014): 21–46.
 Mitter, Rana. "Modernity, internationalization, and war in the history of modern China." Historical Journal  (2005) 48#2 pp. 523–543 online.
 Swope, Kenneth, ed. Warfare in China since 1600 (Routledge, 2017).
 Wilkinson, Endymion. “War.” In Endymion Wilkinson, Chinese History: A New Manual, pp. 339–62. 5th ed. Cambridge, MA: Harvard University Press, 2018.
 Worthing, Peter M. “China's Modern Wars, 1911–Present.” Oxford Online Bibliographies, 2011.
 --. A Military History of Modern China: From the Manchu Conquest to Tian’anmen Square. Westport, Conn.: Praeger, 2007.
 Wortzel, Larry M., and Robin Higham. Dictionary of contemporary Chinese military history (ABC-Clio, 1999).

Mid-Qing to 1912
 Elman, Benjamin A. “Naval Warfare and the Refraction of China's Self-Strengthening Reforms into Scientific and Technological Failure, 1865–1895.” Modern Asian Studies 2 (2004): 283–326.
 Elliott, Jane E. Some Did It for Civilisation, Some Did It for Their Country: A Revised View of the Boxer War. Hong Kong: The Chinese University Press, 2002.
 Fung, Allen. “Testing the Self-Strengthening: The Chinese Army in the Sino-Japanese War of 1894–1895.” Modern Asian Studies 4 (1996): 1007–31.
 Halsey, Stephen R. Quest for Power: European Imperialism and the Making of Chinese Statecraft. Cambridge, MA: Harvard University Press, 2015.
 Klein, Thoralf. “The Boxer War-the Boxer Uprising.” Online Encyclopedia of Mass Violence (2008). Online massacre-resistance/en/document/boxer-war-boxer-uprising.
 Mao Haijian,The Qing Empire and the Opium War: The Collapse of the Heavenly Dynasty , translated by Joseph Lawson, Craig Smith and Peter Lavelle. Cambridge: Cambridge University Press, 2016. (Orig, Tianchao de bengkui. Beijing: Sanlian shudian, 1995).
 Paine, S. C. M. The Sino-Japanese War of 1894–1895: Perceptions, Power and Primacy.Cambridge: Cambridge University Press, 2006.
 Platt, Stephen R. Autumn in the Heavenly Kingdom: China, the West, and the Epic Story of the Taiping Civil War. New York: A.A. Knopf, 2012.
 Thompson, Roger R. “Military Dimensions of the ‘Boxer Uprising’ in Shanxi, 1898–1901.” In Warfare in Chinese History, edited by Hans van de Ven, 288–320. Leiden: Brill, 2000.
 Waley-Cohen, Joanna. The Culture of War in China: Empire and the Military under the Qing Dynasty. London: I. B. Tauris, 2006.

1911-1937
 Chan, Anthony B. Arming the Chinese: The Western Armaments Trade in Warlord China, 1920–1928 . 2nd ed. Vancouver: University of British Columbia Press, 2010.
 Jordan, Donald A. The Northern Expedition: China's National Revolution of 1926–1928. Honolulu: University of Hawai‘i Press, 1976.
 ——. China's Trial by Fire: The Shanghai War of 1932. Ann Arbor: The University of Michigan Press, 2001.
 Diana Lary, “Warlord Studies.” Modern China 4 (1980):439–70. State of the field article.
 McCord, Edward Allen. The Power of the Gun: The Emergence of Modern Chinese Warlordism. Berkeley: University of California Press, 1993.
 Waldron, Arthur. From War to Nationalism: China's Turning Point, 1924–1925. Cambridge: Cambridge University Press, 1995.
 ——. “The Warlord: Twentieth Chinese Understandings of Violence, Militarism, and Imperialism.” The American Historical Review 4 (1991): 1073–1100.

The Second Sino-Japanese War
 Chang, Jui-te. “Nationalist Army Officers during the Sino-Japanese War, 1937–1945.” Modern Asian Studies 4 (1996): 1033–56.
 ———. “The National Army from Whampoa to 1949.” In A Military History of China, edited by David A. Graff and Robin D. S. Higham, 193– 209. Lexington: University of Kentucky Press, 2012.
 Ford, Daniel. Flying Tigers: Claire Chennault and the American Volunteer Group. 2nd edition. Washington, D.C.: Smithsonian Institution Scholarly Press, 2007. 
 Gordon, David M. “The China-Japan War, 1931–1945.” The Journal of Military History 1 (2006): 137–82. Bibliographical essay.
 Hagiwara Mitsuru. “The Japanese Air Campaigns in China, 1937– 1945.” In The Battle for China: Essays on the Military History of the Sino-Japanese War of 1937–1945, edited by Mark R. Peattie, Edward J. Drea and Hans van de Ven, Stanford: Stanford University Press, 2013, 237– 55. 
 Harmsen, Peter. Shanghai 1937: Stalingrad on the Yangzi. Oxford: Casemate, 2013.
 Haruo, Tohmatsu. “The Strategic Correlation Between the Sino-Japanese and Pacific Wars.” In The Battle for China: Essays on the Military History of the Sino-Japanese War of 1937–1945, edited by Mark R. Peattie, Edward J. Drea and Hans van de Ven, 423–45. Stanford: Stanford University Press, 2011.
 Hattori Satoshi with Edward J. Drea, “Japanese Operations from July to December 1937.” In The Battle for China: Essays on the Military History of the Sino-Japanese War of 1937–1945, edited by Mark R. Peattie, Edward J. Drea and Hans van de Ven, 159–80. Stanford: Stanford University Press, 2011.
 Lary, Diana. “Defending China: The Battles of the Xuzhou Campaign.” In Warfare in Chinese History, edited by Hans van de Ven, Leiden: Brill, 2000, pp. 398–427.
 Lew, Christopher R. The Third Chinese Revolutionary Civil War, 1945–49: An Analysis of Communist Strategy and Leadership (Routledge, 2009).
 Mitter, Rana. "Old ghosts, new memories: China's changing war history in the era of post-Mao politics." Journal of Contemporary History 38.1 (2003): 117–131.
 Lary, Diana. “Defending China: The Battles of the Xuzhou Campaign.” In Warfare in Chinese History, edited by Hans van de Ven,  Leiden: Brill, 2000, pp 398–427.
 Li, Chen. “The Chinese Army in the First Burma Campaign.” Journal of Chinese Military History 2 (2013): 43–73.
 MacKinnon, Stephen R. “The Defense of the Central Yangtze.” In The Battle for China: Essays on the Military History of the Sino-Japanese War of 1937–1945, edited by Mark R. Peattie, Edward J. Drea and Hans van de Ven, 181–206. Stanford: Stanford University Press, 2011.
 ——, with Diana Lary, and Ezra F. Vogel, eds. China at War: Regions of China, 1937–45. Stanford: Stanford University Press, 2007.
 ——. Wuhan, 1938: War, Refugees, and the Making of Modern China. Berkeley: University of California Press, 2008.
 Macri, Franco David. Clash of Empires in South China: The Allied Nations’ Proxy War with Japan, 1935–1941 . Lawrence: University Press of Kansas, 2015.
 Martin, Bernd. “The Role of German Military Advisers on the Chinese Defense Efforts Against the Japanese, 1937–1938.” In Resisting Japan: Mobilizing for War in Modern China, 1935–1945, edited by David Pong, 55–78. Norwalk: EastBridge, 2008.
 Mitter, Rana. Forgotten Ally: China ’s World War II, 1937 –1945 . Boston: Houghton Mifflin Harcourt, 2013.
 Peattie, Mark R., Edward J. Drea and Hans van de Ven, eds. The Battle for China:Essays on the Military History of the Sino-Japanese War of 1937–1945 Stanford: Stanford University Press, 2011.
 Phillips, Steve. “A Selected Bibliography of English Language Sources.” In The Battle for China: Essays on the Military History of the Sino-Japanese War of 1937–1945 , edited by Mark R.Peattie, Edward J. Drea and Hans van de Ven. Stanford: Stanford University Press, 2011, pp 371-76.
 Spector, Ronald. “The Sino-Japanese War in the Context of World History.” In The Battle for China: Essays on the Military History of the Sino-Japanese War of 1937–1945, edited by Mark R. Peattie, Edward J. Drea and Hans van de Ven. Stanford: Stanford University Press, 2011, pp. 467-81.
 Takeshi, Hara. “The Ichigō Offensive.” In The Battle for China: Essays on the Military History of the Sino-Japanese War of 1937–1945, edited by Mark R. Peattie, Edward J. Drea and Hans van de Ven. Stanford: Stanford University Press, 2011, pp, 392– 402
 Tow, Edna. “The Great Bombing of Chongqing and the Anti-Japanese War, 1937– 1945.” In The Battle for China: Essays on the Military History of the Sino-Japanese War of 1937–1945, edited by Mark R. Peattie, Edward J. Drea and Hans van de Ven, 237–55. Stanford: Stanford University Press, 2011, pp. 237-55.
 Van de Ven, Hans. “The Sino-Japanese War in History.” In The Battle for China: Essays on the Military History of the Sino-Japanese War of 1937–1945 , edited by Mark R. Peattie, Edward J. Drea and Hans van de Ven, 446–66. Stanford: Stanford University Press, 2011.
 ——. China at War: Triumph and Tragedy in the Emergence of the New China, 1937 - 1952 . London: Profile Books, 2017; Cambridge, MA. Harvard University Press. 2018.
 van Slyke, Lyman P. “The Battle of the Hundred Regiments: Problems of Coordination and Control during the Sino-Japanese War.” Modern Asian Studies 4 (1996): 979–1005.
 Wang, Qisheng. “Battle of Hunan and The Chinese Military's Response to Operation Ichigō.” In The Battle for China: Essays on the Military History of the Sino-Japanese War of 1937–1945 , edited by Mark R. Peattie, Edward J. Drea and Hans van de Ven. Stanford: Stanford University Press, 2011, pp. 403-18.
 Yang, Kuisong. “Nationalist and Communist Guerilla Warfare in North China.” In The Battle for China: Essays on the Military History of the Sino-Japanese War of 1937 –1945 , edited by Mark R. Peattie, Edward J. Drea and Hans van de Ven. Stanford: Stanford University Press, 2011, pp 308–27.
 Yang, Tianshi. “Chiang Kai-shek and the Battles of Shanghai and Nanjing.” In The Battle for China: Essays on the Military History of the Sino-Japanese War of 1937–1945, edited by Mark R. Peattie, Edward J. Drea and Hans van de Ven. Stanford: Stanford University Press, 2011, pp. 143-158.
 Yu, Maochun. The Dragon's War: Allied Operations and the Fate of China, 1937 –1947. New York: Naval Institute Press, 2013.
 Zang, Yunhu. “Chinese Operations in Yunnan and Central Burma.” In The Battle for China: Essays on the Military History of the Sino-Japanese War of 1937 –1945, edited by Mark R. Peattie, Edward J. Drea and Hans van de Ven. Stanford: Stanford University Press, 2011, pp. 386-91.
 Zhang, Baijia. “China's Quest for Foreign Military Aid.” In The Battle for China: Essays on the Military History of the Sino-Japanese War of 1937–1945, edited by Mark R. Peattie, Edward J. Drea and Hans van de Ven, 283– 307. Stanford: Stanford University Press, 2011.

Civil War 1945-1949

 Tanner, Harold Miles. "Guerrilla, mobile, and base warfare in Communist military operations in Manchuria, 1945-1947." Journal of Military History 67.4 (2003): 1177-1222 online.
 Tanner, Harold M. Where Chiang Kai-Shek Lost China: The Liao-Shen Campaign, 1948 (Indiana University Press, 2015).

After 1949
 O'Dowd, Edward C. Chinese Military Strategy in the Third Indochina War: The Last Maoist War (Routledge, 2007).
 Ryan, Mark A., David Michael Finkelstein, and Michael A. McDevitt. Chinese Warfighting: the PLA experience since 1949 (ME Sharpe, 2003).
 Wortzel, Larry M. The dragon extends its reach: Chinese military power goes global (Potomac Books,  2013).